Hlotse (also Leribe) is an important market town in Lesotho. It is situated on the Hlotse River, near the South African border. The town was founded in 1876 by a British missionary, Reverend John Widdicombe. It was a colonial centre until Lesotho gained its independence. The population in 2016 was 38,558.

The alternate name, Leribe, comes from the adjacent French Protestant Leribe Mission, founded in 1859 by François Coillard. Hlotse is also called Leribe because it is the camptown in the district of Leribe.

The main Basotho Headquarters for Help Lesotho is in Hlotse.

Places of interest

Three different sightseeing locations are the Leribe Craft Centre, statue in front of the District Administration office, and an old military lookout.

The Leribe Craft Centre sells handmade wool items ranging from scarfs to jackets. The craft centre is located on the side of the road as a person comes into Hlotse. The statue in front of the District Administration building dates back to English rule of Lesotho. It is located in the central part of the city. The old military lookout also dates back to English rule and is located in the central part of the city.

References

External links

Populated places in Leribe District
Lesotho–South Africa border crossings